is a Prefectural Natural Park in northern Hokkaidō, Japan. The park was established in 1978.

See also
 National Parks of Japan

References

External links 
  Map of Natural Parks of Hokkaidō
  Map of Teshiodake Prefectural Natural Park
  Outdoor Sports in Teshiodake Prefectural Natural Park

Parks and gardens in Hokkaido
Protected areas established in 1978
1978 establishments in Japan